is a Japanese footballer currently playing as a forward for Ventforet Kofu.

Career statistics

Club

Notes

References

External links

2004 births
Living people
Association football people from Yamanashi Prefecture
Japanese footballers
Japan youth international footballers
Association football forwards
J2 League players
Ventforet Kofu players